Weatherburn is a surname. Notable people with the surname include:

Charles Ernest Weatherburn (1884–1974), Australian-born mathematician
David Weatherburn, chemistry academic
Don Weatherburn (born 1951), Australian criminologist